The Kennisbank Filosofie in Nederland (KFN) is a database in which information can be found about philosophy, especially from the Netherlands. The bibliography consists of about 35.000 records of publications on philosophy in the Netherlands and Flanders. This database was based in the first place on Prof. Poortman's 4-vol. work.

Philosophical literature
Bibliographic databases and indexes
Databases in the Netherlands
Dutch culture
Philosophical databases